Lee Yang-jong (born 17 July 1989) is a South Korean football goalkeeper, who plays for Gangneung City in the Korea National League.

Club career
Lee, a draftee from the 2011 K League draft intake, was selected by Daegu FC for the 2011 K-League season. Although not the first choice keeper, Daegu FC manager Lee Young-jin gave Lee his professional debut before a home crowd in a match against Seongnam Ilhwa Chunma on 25 June 2011, during which Lee conceded a goal as well as earning a yellow card.

Club career statistics

References

External links

1989 births
Living people
Association football goalkeepers
South Korean footballers
Daegu FC players
K League 1 players
K League 2 players